Yushin may refer to:
 The October Restoration, a coup d'etat in the history of South Korea
 The Yushin Constitution, a constitution established after the coup
 Yushin High School, a high school in Suwon, South Korea
 Yushin Okami, a mixed martial artist
 Sergeant Yushin, referring to either of two fictional characters:
An antagonist in the 1985 film Rambo: First Blood Part II
A minor character in the 2006 video game Secret Files: Tunguska
Three Japanese whale catchers:
Yūshin Maru
Yūshin Maru No. 2
Yūshin Maru No. 3